The 2018–19 South Alabama Jaguars women's basketball team represented the University of South Alabama during the 2018–19 NCAA Division I women's basketball season. The Jaguars were led by sixth year head coach Terry Fowler and played their home games at the Mitchell Center as members in the Sun Belt Conference. They finished the season 25–11, 9–9 in Sun Belt play to finish in a tie for sixth place. They advanced to the championship game of the Sun Belt women's tournament where they lost to Little Rock. They received an at-large bid to the WNIT where they defeated Lamar in the first round before losing to Wyoming in the second round.

Roster

Schedule

|-
!colspan=9 style=| Exhibition

|-
!colspan=9 style=| Non-conference regular season

|-
!colspan=9 style=| Sun Belt regular season

|-
!colspan=9 style=| Sun Belt Women's Tournament

|-
!colspan=9 style=| WNIT

Rankings
2018–19 NCAA Division I women's basketball rankings

See also
 2018–19 South Alabama Jaguars men's basketball team

References

External links

South Alabama Jaguars women's basketball seasons
South Alabama
South Alabama